Patrick Quinn (born 1952) was a volunteer with the 1st Battalion, South Armagh Brigade of the Provisional Irish Republican Army (IRA) who took part in the 1981 Irish hunger strike.

Paramilitary activity
On 2 March 1977, Quinn and Raymond McCreesh were convicted and sentenced to fourteen years in prison for attempted murder, possession of a rifle and ammunition and a further five years for IRA membership.

Quinn joined the hunger strike on 15 June 1981. When he was close to death after 47 days his mother asked for medical help to save his life. Paddy Quinn and his mother both described what happened in interviews for a BBC documentary on the hunger strikes in 1993. He was the first hunger striker whose family intervened.

References

1962 births
Irish republicans
Irish republicans imprisoned on charges of terrorism
Living people
Irish people convicted of attempted murder
People from County Armagh
Provisional Irish Republican Army members
Irish hunger strikers